A papoose is a Native American child.

Papoose may also refer to:

 Papoose (rapper), an American rapper
 Cradle board, a type of child carrier
 Papoose board, a type of medical restraint
 Papoose (tanker), an American ship launched in 1921
 Marlin Model 70P, a portable semi-automatic .22 rifle, known as the Marlin "Papoose"
 Papoose on the Loose, a cartoon by Walter Lantz
 Piper PA-29 Papoose, a single engine light airplane produced by Piper Aircraft
 Walter "Papoose" Nelson, American R&B guitarist